Isabel Boyer Gillies (born February 9, 1970) is an American author and actress. She played Kathy Stabler, Elliot Stabler's wife in Law & Order: Special Victims Unit. Her memoir Happens Every Day was a New York Times bestseller, and her most recent book is Cozy.

Early life and education 
Gillies was born and raised in New York City. She attended the Brearley School before graduating from the Nightingale-Bamford School. As a student, Gillies struggled with severe dyslexia. She graduated from New York University with a BFA in film. Gillies is the daughter of Archibald and Linda Gillies.

Career 
Gillies landed her first movie role when Whit Stillman cast her as Cynthia McLean in his pioneering independent film, Metropolitan (1990). Other film credits include Finley in Another Girl Another Planet (1992), Alison in I Shot Andy Warhol (1996), Moira Ingalls in On Line (2002), Isabel in Happy Here and Now (2002), and Kathryn in New Orleans, Mon Amour (2008).

Prior to her role as Kathy Stabler on SVU, which she played from 1999 to 2011, Gillies appeared in "Bad Girl," an episode of the original Law & Order series, playing Monica Johnson, a young woman who murders an undercover police officer and then undergoes a religious conversion during her trial and is born again. In 2000, she played the role of Alison in the short-lived Fox series, The $treet. In 2021, she reprised her role as Kathy Stabler for one episode during season 22 of SVU; the cross-over episode that launched Law & Order: Organized Crime. The handling of her character led Gillies to discuss how fandom had changed due to social media.

Books
In addition to writing for a number of outlets, including the Los Angeles Times, The New York Times, Gillies has four books to her credit.

Her 2009 memoir, Happens Every Day, is about her leaving New York City to follow her first husband to Oberlin College. Happens Every Day was a New York Times bestseller. It was featured by Starbucks as a nationwide selection for its book program. NPR's Fresh Air selected it as a Top Ten Book of 2009. Her follow-up memoir, A Year and Six Seconds, was published in 2011.

In 2014, Gillies tried her hand with fiction with Starry Night. This young-adult novel was published by Farrar, Straus & Giroux in September 2014.

In 2019, she returned to non-fiction with Cozy. This was published by Harper Wave.  The New York Times Book Review said of it, “For Gillies, coziness is a state of mind, the environments we create in our homes to feel at ease. Think of her as a companion to Marie Kondo, filling up all those spaces once they’ve been decluttered.”

Personal life
She was married to DeSales Harrison, an English professor at Oberlin College, from 1999 to 2005. Gillies married Peter Lattman, an editor at The New York Times, on October 13, 2007. Gillies spends her summers in Islesboro, Maine.

Filmography

Film

Television

References

External links

American television actresses
Actresses from New York City
Tisch School of the Arts alumni
21st-century American memoirists
Living people
1970 births
Writers from New York City
American women memoirists
People from Islesboro, Maine
American film actresses
20th-century American actresses
21st-century American actresses
21st-century American women writers
Brearley School alumni
Nightingale-Bamford School alumni